Marie-Anne-Hyacinthe Horthemels (1682 – 24 March 1727) was a French engraver, wife of the King's engraver Nicolas-Henri Tardieu.

Biography

Marie-Anne-Hyacinthe Horthemels was one of three daughters of the Dutch bookseller Daniel Horthemels (c. 1650-1691) and his wife Marie Cellier (b. 1656), from Saint-Maurice, to the southeast of Paris.
The family converted from Protestantism to Roman Catholicism, and became followers of the theologian Cornelius Jansen.
Marie-Anne had at least five siblings.
Her sister Louise-Magdeleine Horthemels was an active reproductive engraver who married Charles-Nicolas Cochin, graveur du roi.
Marie-Nicole married Alexis Simon Belle, peintre ordinaire du roi.
Her brothers Daniel and Denys continued in the bookselling trade, while Frédéric Horthemels was also an engraver.

Marie-Anne's first marriage was to the pastry-maker Germain Le Coq, who had worked for King Louis XIV of France (1638–1715) and for the Duchess of Burgundy.
They married around 1705, and Germain died around 1710.
They had at least one son, Germain-Jacques Lecocq.
At the age of thirty, on 20 April 1712 she married again, to Nicolas-Henri Tardieu. They had five children: Louis-Nicolas, Jacques-Nicolas, Pierre-Denis, Marie-Perrette and Marie Madelaine. 
Jacques-Nicolas Tardieu was born on 2 September 1716 in Paris.
He was also to become a well-known engraver.

Marie-Anne-Hyacinthe Horthemels died on 24 March 1727 at the age of 45.

Work
Marie-Anne had a talent for engraving, and is known for her portraits of Cardinal de Bissy, Cardinal de Rohan and the Regent Philippe II, Duke of Orléans. 
The British Museum has an engraved portrait of James Francis Edward Stuart, the  Old Pretender, after a painting by Alexis Simon Belle, dated 1720.
The portrait was engraved by "MM. Horthemels", and is thought to be her work.

References

Sources

 

1682 births
1727 deaths
18th-century engravers
French engravers
French women printmakers
18th-century French artists
18th-century French women artists
Women engravers